Findley is a surname of Irish and Scottish origin. Spellings include, but are not limited to, Findley, Findlay, Finley, and Finlay. The name is an Anglicized form of the Old Gaelic name Fionnlagh or Fionnlugh which is composed of the elements fionn and lagh: fionn means fair, fair complected or beautiful;
lagh from laogh means hero. It has its root in the old Celtic deity Lugh (Lugus).

List of people with the surname 
 Chuck Findley (born 1947), American session musician
 Craig J. Findley (born 1948), American newspaper editor, photographer, and politician
 Edward Findley (1864–1947), Australian politician
 Edwina Findley (born 1980), American actress
 Ferguson Findley (1910–1963), American novelist
 Gbehzohngar Milton Findley (born 1960), Liberian government official
 Jim Findley, Trinidadian actor
 Kelly Findley (born 1970), American soccer coach
 Lynn Findley (born 1952), American politician
 Nigel Findley (1959–1995), game designer and science fiction novelist
 Paul Findley (1921–2019), US Representative
 Rick Findley (born 1950), Canadian air force commander
 Robbie Findley (born 1985), American soccer player
 Rowe Findley (1925–2003), American journalist
 Timothy Findley (1930–2002), Canadian novelist
 Trent Findley (born 1980), American football player
 Troy Findley (born 1964), former Kansas Lieutenant Governor and former Kansas state Representative
 William Findley (1741–1821), American politician

See also 

 Lake Findley
Fendley
 Findley Lake, New York

Surnames of English origin
Surnames of Irish origin
Surnames of Scottish origin
Surnames of British Isles origin
Anglicised Scottish Gaelic-language surnames